District No. 2 School may refer to:

District No. 2 School (Passadumkeag, Maine), listed on the National Register of Historic Places in Penobscot County, Maine
District No. 2 School (Georgia, Vermont), listed on the  National Register of Historic Places in Franklin County, Vermont
See also
District No. 2 Schoolhouse, in Wakefield, New Hampshire, listed on the National Register of Historic Places in Carroll County, New Hampshire
Grafton District Schoolhouse No. 2, in Grafton, Vermont, listed on the National Register of Historic Places in Windham County, Vermont